Rob Arnoldus Adrianus Jetten (born 25 March 1987) is a Dutch politician of Democrats 66 (D66). He served as the party's parliamentary leader in the House of Representatives.

Early life and education 
Jetten grew up in Uden, Noord-Brabant and attended his secondary education at Udens College between 1999 and 2005. He then studied at the Radboud University Nijmegen, where he obtained a BA in 2010 and an MA degree in 2011, both in public administration. After a period as a management trainee at the Dutch railway authority ProRail, he continued working there as a consultant and as a regional supply manager for the north-eastern Netherlands.

Political career 
Jetten began his political career as a policy advisor for the D66 faction in the Senate of the States General and as the chairman of the Young Democrats. In addition, between 2010 and 2017, he was a member of the municipal council of Nijmegen. In the 2017 Dutch general election, he was elected as a member of the House of Representatives. Jetten then became his party's spokesperson for climate, energy and gas, railways, democratic renewal and economic affairs.

On 9 October 2018, Jetten was chosen as the new parliamentary leader of D66 in the House of Representatives, succeeding Alexander Pechtold. This did not automatically make him the new party leader as the new leader eventually was to be chosen in the 2020 Democrats 66 leadership election. Aged 31, Jetten became the youngest ever parliamentary leader of D66. After his election, Jetten faced criticism in Dutch media because of his relative young age.

Under his leadership, the Dutch government announced plans in 2022 to invest 750 million euros ($789 million) through to 2031 to have the country's gas network operator Gasunie develop a national hydrogen transportation network.

Personal life 
Rob Jetten is currently not married. He is openly gay and lives with his boyfriend, Sjoerd van Gils, in Ubbergen, Gelderland, Netherlands. He has no children.

On the International Day against Homophobia and Transphobia in 2020, he read a number of hate messages received regarding his homosexuality in a Twitter message. He says he received dozens of these messages every day. Under a pseudonym, people abused him because of his sexual orientation. Jetten wanted to show that this international day against homophobia was really necessary.

References

External links
Official
  Drs. R.A.A. (Rob) Jetten, Parlement.com
  Jetten R.A.A. (D66), Tweede Kamer der Staten-Generaal

1987 births
Living people
21st-century Dutch politicians
Democrats 66 politicians
Dutch people of Indonesian descent
Dutch political consultants
Dutch speechwriters
Gay politicians
LGBT cabinet members of the Netherlands
LGBT members of the Parliament of the Netherlands
Members of the House of Representatives (Netherlands)
Ministers without portfolio of the Netherlands
Municipal councillors of Nijmegen
People from Veghel
Radboud University Nijmegen alumni
20th-century Dutch people